Bubi may refer to:

 Bubi people, an ethnic group in Central Africa
 Bubi language, a Bantu language spoken in Bioko Island, Equatorial Guinea
 Bubi District, Zimbabwe
 Bubi River, a tributary of the Limpopo River in Zimbabwe
 BuBi, a bicycle sharing system in Budapest

People with the nickname 
 Josef Bradl (1918–1982), Austrian ski jumper
 Erich Hartmann (1922–1993), German fighter pilot
 Bubi Rohde (1914–1979), German footballer
 Adolf von Thadden (1921–1996), German politician
 Bubi Wallenius (born 1943), Finnish sports commentator

See also 
 Booby (disambiguation)

Lists of people by nickname